Jeannette Dominique Sagna (born 4 August 1999) is a Senegalese footballer who plays as a midfielder for AS Dakar Sacré Coeur and the Senegal women's national team.

Club career
Sagna has played for Dakar Sacré Cœur in Senegal.

International career
Sagna capped for Senegal at senior level during the 2022 Africa Women Cup of Nations qualification.

References

1999 births
Living people
Senegalese women's footballers
Women's association football midfielders
Senegal women's international footballers